The Other (or TheOther) is a German horror punk band formed in Cologne in 2002. The band's music style blends elements of punk rock and heavy metal, with lyrics and stage costumes inspired by horror fiction and films. Although most of their material is in English, they also write and perform songs in German.

History 

The Other began as a Misfits cover band. They released their first album, They're Alive!, in 2004 with a cover art inspired by classic horror film posters that has an actor "starring" section for the band members: "STARRING: Andy Only, Dr Caligari, Rod Usher, Sarge von Rock and.... The Creature".

Their first official music video "Lover's Lane" was a subject of controversy in Germany because it was featuring German porn star Leonie Saint.

In 2007, The Other published their first comic book: Tales of the Other (Comicheft, Weissblech-Verlag).
Most of the band's albums were released on the group member's own record label, Fiend Force Records, but they recorded "New Blood" (2010) with rock label SPV/Steamhammer.

Many influential horror punk artists like Blitzkid, Bloodsucking Zombies from Outer Space, Mister Monster, The Crimson Ghosts, Nim Vind, Rezurex or The Deep Eynde released albums through The Other's independent label Fiend Force Records
.

Tours and live performances 

The Other toured with famous bands like British punk rock pioneers The Damned, The Cult, Alice Cooper, the Misfits, The 69 Eyes, Balzac and Wednesday 13. In 2015, they toured in the United Kingdom with British horror punk/metal groups Al B. Damned and Lupen Tooth as well as German groups like Die Ärzte or Dr. Hell.

Throughout the years, The Other was part of numerous alternative/punk/heavy metal Festivals and events in Europe like the Wacken Open Air, the M'era Luna Festival, the Summer Breeze Open Air, Force Attack, the Wave-Gotik-Treffen, Endless Summer, the Ruhrpott Rodeo, the Fangoria's Weekend of Horrors, the Amphi Festival and The Travelling Morgue Horror Fest

Lifestyle and influences 
The Other's songwriting, musical style, and performances are strongly influenced by classic horror movies and literature.

Among the actors and films that influenced the band lyrics and lifestyle (Gothic fashion, makeup), lead vocalist Rod Usher mentions: Bela Lugosi in Mark of the Vampire, Vincent Price in Andre DeToth's House of Wax (1953), Klaus Kinski in Werner Herzog's Nosferatu the Vampyre (1979) and Christopher Lee in Terence Fisher's Dracula (1958), Jack Arnold's Creature from the Black Lagoon (1954), Tarantula (1955) and more recently Alexandre Aja's Haute Tension (2003).

Band members

Current 
 Rod Usher – vocals (2002–present)
 Dr. Caligari – drums (2002–present) 
 Ben Crowe – guitar (2013–present)
 Pat Laveau – guitar (2014–present)
 Aaron Torn – bass (2014–2016, 2019–present)

Former 

 Chris Cranium – bass (2016–2019)
 Jack Saw – guitar (2013–2014)
 Sarge von Rock – guitar (2002–2013)
 Viktor Sharp – bass (2010–2014)
 Migore Drake – bass (2006–2010)
 Andy Only – bass (2002–2006)

Timeline

Discography 
Studio albums

References

External links 

 Official website
 

German punk rock groups
Musical groups established in 2002
Horror punk groups
2002 establishments in Germany